Rose Prairie is a settlement in British Columbia.

Rose Prairie is an area of British Columbia located 2,240 feet above sea level and about 30 km north of Fort St. John, BC. In 1950 the Chinchaga Fire started in Rose Prairie. It was and still is the single largest recorded fire in North American history.

http://roadsidethoughts.com/bc/rose-prairie-profile.htm

Settlements in British Columbia
Populated places in the Peace River Regional District